Fathi Mabrouk (born 5 July 1951) is an Egyptian former football defender who played for Egypt in the 1980 African Cup of Nations. He also played for Al Ahly.

On 5 May 2015, Mabrouk was appointed new manager of Al Ahly after Juan Carlos Garrido was sacked. On 6 October 2015, Mabrouk was sacked.

Honours

Managerial
Al-Ahly
Egyptian Premier League: 2013–14

References

External links

1951 births
Living people
Egyptian footballers
Egypt international footballers
1976 African Cup of Nations players
1980 African Cup of Nations players
Al Ahly SC players
Petrojet SC managers
Egyptian Premier League players
Association football defenders
Egyptian football managers
Al Ahly SC managers